The People's Justice Party (often known simply as KEADILAN or PKR) is a reformist political party in Malaysia formed on 3 August 2003 through a merger of the party's predecessor, the National Justice Party, with the socialist Malaysian People's Party. The party's predecessor was founded by Wan Azizah Wan Ismail during the height of the Reformasi movement on 4 April 1999 after the arrest of her husband, former Deputy Prime Minister Anwar Ibrahim. In the first election contested by the party in 1999, the party would go on to win five seats in the Dewan Rakyat. However, an election wave for the ruling Barisan Nasional coalition in 2004 reduced the party to just one seat before another election wave in 2008 favoring the opposition increased the party's parliamentary representation to 31 seats as well as forming the government in 5 states, thus triggering the resignation of Prime Minister Tun Abdullah Ahmad Badawi and a lift on the five-year political ban imposed on Anwar Ibrahim on 14 April 2008. The party is currently as the largest political party in the Pakatan Harapan (PH) coalition.

Pakatan Harapan had previously defeated Barisan Nasional, which had ruled the country for 60 years since independence, in the 2018 general elections. However, defections from within PKR as well as the withdrawal of the Malaysian United Indigenous Party (BERSATU) from the coalition caused the collapse of the PH government after just 22 months in power, culminating in the 2020 Malaysian political crisis that resulted in the rise of the Perikatan Nasional government with ally-turned-enemy Muhyiddin Yassin at the helm. The PH coalition would return to power once again after the 2022 elections produced a hung parliament for the first time in the country's history, allowing Anwar Ibrahim to serve as the 10th Prime Minister of Malaysia through a unity government with his political rivals in Barisan Nasional as well as other political coalitions and parties to achieve a two-thirds majority in the Dewan Rakyat.

The party enjoys strong support from urban states such as Selangor, Penang, Perak, Negeri Sembilan and Johor, as well as the capital city of Kuala Lumpur. It promotes an agenda with a strong emphasis on social justice and anti-corruption, as well as adopting a platform that seeks to abolish the New Economic Policy to replace it with an economic policy that takes a non-ethnic approach in poverty eradication and correcting economic imbalances.

History

Early years 

The economy of Malaysia was affected by the 1997 Asian financial crisis. The finance minister at the time, Anwar Ibrahim (also the deputy prime minister), instituted a series of economic reforms and austerity measures in response. These actions were exacerbated when he tabled controversial amendments to the Anti-Corruption Act that sought to increase the powers of the Malaysian Anti-Corruption Commission (MACC). Prime Minister Mahathir Mohamad disagreed with these measures and ultimately sacked Anwar from all his posts. This incident and the circumstances in which it happened led to a public outcry in what became known as the Reformasi movement, but it also resulted in the arrest and subsequent incarceration of Anwar on what many believed to be politically motivated charges of sexual misconduct and corruption.

The movement, which began while the country hosted the Commonwealth Games, initially demanded the resignation of Malaysia's then-Prime Minister, Mahathir Mohamad, and for the end of alleged corruption and cronyism within the Barisan Nasional-led (BN) government. It would go on to become a reformist movement demanding social equality and social justice in Malaysia. The movement consisted of civil disobedience, demonstrations, sit-ins, rioting, occupations and online activism.

Foundation
Once Anwar had been detained, the Reformasi movement continued to develop, with  "Justice for Anwar" remaining a potent rallying call. Before his arrest, Anwar had designated his wife, Wan Azizah Wan Ismail, as the successor of the movement.  Wan Azizah developed an enormous following, attracting thousands to her speeches. For a time, these followers held massive weekend street demonstrations, mostly in Kuala Lumpur but also occasionally in Penang and other cities, for "keadilan" (justice) and against Mahathir.

Building on the momentum of Reformasi, a political movement called the Social Justice Movement, also known as ADIL, was launched on 10 December 1998 and was led by Wan Azizah. However, facing difficulties in registering ADIL as a political party, the Reformasi movement instead merged with the Muslim Community Union of Malaysia, a minor Islamic political party based in Terengganu, and relaunched it as the National Justice Party, also known as PKN or KeADILan, on 4 April 1999. The registration was just in time for the new party to take part in the 1999 general elections. The launch of KeADILan put to rest months of speculation about whether Wan Azizah and Anwar would merely remain in ADIL, join PAS, or try to stage a coup against UMNO. Although Keadilan was multiracial, its primary target was middle-class, middle-of-the-road Malays, particularly from UMNO. The party has been noted as having rough similarities with the now-defunct multi-racial social democratic Parti Keadilan Masyarakat Malaysia. The party was joined by the Democratic Action Party (DAP), the Malaysian People's Party (PRM) and the Pan-Malaysian Islamic Party (PAS) in a big tent alliance of liberals, socialists, and Islamists known as Barisan Alternatif to take on the ruling BN coalition in the 1999 general elections.

Arrests
Between 27 and 30 September 1999, seven activists, including Keadilan leaders; Vice-President Tian Chua, N. Gobalakrishnan, Youth leader Mohd Ezam Mohd Nor, Fairus Izuddin and Dr Badrul Amin Baharun; were arrested and as a result prevented from contesting in the elections. Further arrests were made on 10 April 2001 and those arrested were subsequently charged and incarcerated under the Internal Security Act. They became known as the Reformasi 10.

1999 general election 
The legislative elections of 29 November 1999 were convened in advance, the pretext being the start of Ramadan. As the outgoing Parliament was dissolved on 11 November, the campaign was very short, drawing strong criticism from the opposition. The party entered the campaign with many of its key leaders under arrest along with many disadvantages, as the short campaign was marked by the distribution of pornographic videocassettes implicating former Deputy Prime Minister Anwar in the villages, as well as the opposition having a lack of access to written and audiovisual media. As a result of the mounting disadvantages, the election saw the party winning only five parliamentary seats in the elections despite gaining 11.67% of the total votes cast. However, Wan Azizah was elected as the Member of Parliament for Permatang Pauh; the seat formerly held by her husband, Anwar Ibrahim, with a majority of 9,077 votes. The Barisan Alternatif as a whole gained 40.21% of the total votes cast with PAS winning 27 seats and DAP winning ten seats. The big opposition winner was PAS, which gained 20 seats as well as a majority in two Assemblies in the northern States of Kelantan and Terangganu. As for the BN coalition of Mahathir Mohamad, it however scored a two-thirds majority with 148 seats (despite losing 14 seats). Nevertheless, the BN coalition lost power in two of the thirteen states, along with four members of Mahathir's Cabinet who also lost their seats. For the first time in Malaysia's history, UMNO, the dominant Malay-based party which had ruled the country for 40 years since independence, received less than half of the total vote of ethnic Malays.

Merger with Parti Rakyat Malaysia 
The post election period saw negotiations between KeADILan and Parti Rakyat Malaysia on a possible merger. Despite some opposition in both parties to the move, a 13-point Memorandum of Understanding was eventually signed by the two parties on 5 July 2002. On 3 August 2003, the new merged entity was officially launched and assumed its current name. Somehow, as PRM had yet to be de-registered by the authorities, the remained dissidents convened a National Congress in Johor Bahru and elected a new Executive Committee led by former PRM youth leader, Hassan Abdul Karim to resume political activities on 17 April 2005.

2004 general election 
As the new amendments to the party constitution had yet to be approved by the Registrar of Societies, candidates from PRM contested the 2004 general election using the symbol of the old National Justice Party. The party fared poorly in the elections and only managed to retain one parliamentary seat, Permatang Pauh which is held by Dr Wan Azizah, despite winning 9% of the popular vote. The poor showing was later attributed to malapportionment and gerrymandering in the delineation of constituencies, with one estimate suggesting that on average, a vote for the BN government was worth 28 times the vote of a Keadilan supporter.

Anwar Ibrahim freed 
On 2 September 2004, in a decision by the Federal Court, Anwar Ibrahim's sodomy conviction was overturned and he was freed. This unexpected turn of events came timely for KEADILAN which was facing flagging morale due to its dismal performance in the elections.

In December 2005 PKR organised its second national congress. Among the motions passed was the New Economic Agenda that envisioned a non-racial economic policy to replace the race-based New Economic Policy. PKR managed a breakthrough into Sarawak politics in May 2006. In Sarawak state elections, Dominique Ng, a lawyer and activist, won in the Padungan constituency in Kuching, a majority Chinese locale. KEADILAN lost narrowly in Saribas, a Malay-Melanau constituency by just 94 votes. Sarawak is a traditional BN stronghold. PKR has also pursued an aggressive strategy of getting key personalities from within and outside politics. In July 2006, Khalid Ibrahim, former CEO of Permodalan Nasional Berhad and Guthrie, was appointed as Treasurer of the PKR.

2008 general election 
In the 2008 elections, PKR won 31 seats in Parliament, with the DAP and PAS making substantial gains as well with 28 seats and 23 seats respectively. In total, the taking of 82 seats by the opposition to BN's 140 seats made it the best performance in Malaysian history by the opposition, and denied BN the two-thirds majority required to make constitutional changes in the Dewan Rakyat.

PKR also successfully contested the state legislative elections which saw the loose coalition of PKR, DAP and PAS forming coalition governments in the states of Kelantan, Kedah, Penang, Perak and Selangor. The offices of the Menteri Besar of Selangor and the Deputy Chief Minister of Penang were held by KEADILAN elected representatives, Khalid Ibrahim and Mohd Fairus Khairuddin, respectively.

Anwar's return to politics 
On 14 April 2008, Anwar celebrated his official return to the political stage, as his ban from public office expired a decade after he was sacked as deputy prime minister. One of the main reasons the opposition seized a third of parliamentary seats and five states in the worst ever showing for the BN coalition that has ruled for half a century, was due to him leading at the helm. A gathering of more than 10,000 supporters greeted Anwar in a rally welcoming back his return to politics. In the midst of the rally, police interrupted Anwar after he had addressed the rally for nearly half an hour and forced him to stop the gathering.

Malaysia's government intensified its efforts on 6 March to portray opposition figure Anwar Ibrahim as political turncoats, days ahead of Malaysian general election, 2008 on 8 March that would determine whether he posed a legitimate threat to the ruling coalition. Campaigning wrapped up 7 March for general elections that would see gains for Malaysia's opposition amid anger over race and religion among minority Chinese and Indians. Malaysians voted on 8 March 2008 in parliamentary elections. Election results showed that the ruling government suffered a setback when it failed to obtain two-thirds majority in parliament, and five out of 12 state legislatures were won by the opposition parties. Reasons for the setback of the ruling party, which had retained power since the nation declared independence in 1957, were the rising inflation, crime and ethnic tensions.

Permatang Pauh by-election 
Malaysia's government and ruling coalition declared defeat in a landslide victory in the by-election by Anwar Ibrahim. Muhammad Muhammad Taib, information chief of the United Malays National Organisation which leads the BN coalition stated: Yes of course we have lost . . . we were the underdogs going into this race. Malaysia's Election Commission officials announced Anwar won by an astounding majority against Arif Shah Omar Shah of National Front coalition and over Prime Minister Abdullah Badawi's UMNO. Reuters reported that according to news website Malaysiakini, Anwar Ibrahim had won with a majority of 16,210 votes. He had won 26,646 votes, while BN's Arif Omar won 10,436 votes. Anwar's People's Justice Party's spokeswoman Ginie Lim told BBC: "We won already. We are far ahead".

On 28 August 2008, Anwar, dressed in a dark blue traditional Malay outfit and black "songkok" hat, took the oath at the main chamber of Parliament house in Kuala Lumpur, as MP for Permatang Pauh at 10.03 am before Speaker Tan Sri Pandikar Amin Mulia. He formally declared Anwar the leader of the 3-party opposition alliance. With his wife Wan Azizah Wan Ismail and his daughter Nurul Izzah Anwar, also a parliamentarian, Anwar announced: "I'm glad to be back after a decade. The prime minister has lost the mandate of the country and the nation". Anwar needed at least 30 government lawmakers especially from Sabah and Sarawak MPs' votes to defect to form a government.

Suara Keadilan publication license suspended 
In June 2010, Suara Keadilan's publication was suspended for publishing a report which claimed a government agency is bankrupt. Suara Keadilan is run by opposition leader Anwar Ibrahim's PKR party. The Home Ministry, which oversees Malaysia's newspapers, said it was not satisfied with the paper's explanation for the allegedly inaccurate report.

Kajang Move 

In 2014, the Party's Strategy Director then Vice-President-cum-Secretary-General, Rafizi Ramli initiated the failed Kajang Move in a bid to topple the 14th Menteri Besar of Selangor, Abdul Khalid Ibrahim, and install the party's de facto leader Anwar Ibrahim as his replacement. The political manoeuvre resulted in a nine-month political crisis within the state of Selangor and the Pakatan Rakyat coalition, that also involved the palace of Selangor, a by-election costing RM1.6 million in taxpayers’ money, the party losing one seat in Selangor's assembly and Malaysian Parliament. PKR also ended up not getting the Menteri Besar that it wanted. The crisis concluded with the appointment of PKR's Deputy President, Azmin Ali, as the 15th Menteri Besar of Selangor. Most analysts say that the Kajang Move was a great failure.

PD Move
On 12 September 2018 the incumbent Danyal Balagopal Abdullah resigned as Member of Parliament for Port Dickson to allow Anwar Ibrahim, who had been granted a royal pardon by the country's monarch the Yang di-Pertuan Agong to re-enter parliament after a 3-year absence. The resignation caused the Port Dickson by-election, 2018 and was dubbed the 'PD Move'. Anwar won the seat with an increased majority against six other candidates.

Collapse of the Pakatan Harapan government
The 2020 Malaysian political crisis culminated in the collapse of the Pakatan Harapan government. The political crisis began when several political forces, including then PKR deputy president Azmin Ali, attempted to depose the current government led by Prime Minister Mahathir Mohamad by forming a new government without going through a general election. This was achieved through backroom deals popularly known as the Sheraton Move, which saw the withdrawal of BERSATU from the coalition as well as the exit of Azmin Ali along with 10 other PKR MPs. This deprived the coalition of its majority and paved the way for Muhyiddin Yassin, the President of BERSATU, to form a backdoor government positioning himself as Prime Minister with the support of the newly formed Perikatan Nasional coalition 

During the political crisis, in a Facebook Live broadcast of a night prayer session at Anwar's residence, Anwar said that he had been informed of a "treachery" being committed that involved "former friends from BERSATU and a small group from PKR". Later, Azmin, in a statement, claimed that his action was to protect then Prime Minister Mahathir Mohamad, who was forced to choose a date for the transition of power during Pakatan Harapan's presidential meeting on 21 February, and that the statutory declaration presented to the Agong was to cement support for Mahathir, not to elect a new prime minister. He further said that the real traitor was the faction that tried to usurp Mahathir.

On 24 February 2020, PKR held a press conference where its general secretary, Saifuddin Nasution Ismail, announced that Azmin and the Minister of Housing and Local Government, Zuraida Kamaruddin, who was then a vice president of PKR, had been dismissed by the party. Saifuddin explained that they were expelled due to their actions on 23 February which went against the party's official line regarding the position of Prime Minister. Azmin later announced that he would be forming an independent bloc at the parliament along with Zuraida and the other nine MPs who had left the party following his expulsion.

PKR held a meeting at its headquarters on 1 March 2020. While leaving the headquarters after the meeting ended, members who were associated with the former deputy president Azmin Ali, such as vice-president Tian Chua and former youth wing deputy chief Afif Bahardin, were harassed and assaulted by PKR supporters who accused them of being "traitors". Police later revealed that one arrest had been made in relation to the incident involving Chua, with at least two reports were lodged.

A large number of PKR grassroots member who aligned with Azmin's camp had left the party once the political crisis began. This began with three PKR Kelantan branch leaders who announced their immediate departure from the party on 26 February after Azmin and Zuraida Kamaruddin, the party's vice-president, were sacked from their positions and expelled after their betrayal in the Sheraton Move. This continued with around 2,000 members from the Pasir Puteh branch in Kelantan leaving the party on 28 February,  followed by 536 members from the Kota Raja branch in Selangor on 1 March. The day after, around 400 PKR members in Perak also left the party. This exodus was continued by the exit of 500 members from the Arau and Padang Besar branches in Perlis on 15 March.

On 4 March 2020, the Penang Exco of Agriculture, Agro-based Industries, Rural Development and Health, Afif Bahardin, resigned from his position in Penang State Executive Council. A known supporter of Azmin Ali back when the latter was the party's deputy president, he claimed to have been pressured by the party's state and central leadership to resign from his post.  He was replaced by Norlela Ariffin, the state assemblywoman for Penanti, who was appointed as the new state councillor and sworn in on 12 March in front of the Yang Dipertua Negeri, Abdul Rahman Abbas. On the same day, Chong Fat Full, another Azmin ally representing  Pemanis in the Johor assembly, formally announced his exit from the party to become a Perikatan-friendly independent, effectively handling them a majority in the state assembly with a marginal 29 seats against Harapan's 27, thus seizing control of a key state that had previously been won by Harapan.

The collapse of Harapan governments in the state level continued on 12 May when two Azmin allies in the Kedah assembly: Robert Ling Kui Ee and Azman Nasrudin, representing Sidam and Lunas respectively, had both left the party to become independents supporting Perikatan Nasional. This handed a majority for Perikatan to form the Kedah government, seizing yet another state that had previously been won by Harapan, thus leaving the coalition with only 13 of 36 seats. This allowed Kedah state opposition leader Muhammad Sanusi Md Nor to announce the formation of a new government later in the day with the support of 23 state assemblymen, including the two ex-PKR members and four of six BERSATU assemblymen previously aligned with Pakatan Harapan. What followed was another departure on 17 May by the Srikandi Keadilan Chief, Nurainie Haziqah Shafii, claiming to have 'lost confidence in the idealism of the struggle and the direction of PKR'.

The month of June witnessed the departure of more PKR members and representatives, beginning with the Member of Parliament (MP) for Lubok Antu, Jugah Muyang, on 5 June. He had been elected as an independent in the previous election before joining PKR after they had formed the government. However, he left them for BERSATU after the latter deposed the previous government and became the new ruling party. This was followed by another independent MP, Syed Abu Hussin Hafiz, who was MP for Bukit Gantang and had previously been elected under UMNO, who also joined BERSATU alongside Jugah. The departures continued on June 13, when Daroyah Alwi, the Deputy Speaker & Exco of the Selangor state assembly as well as an ally of Azmin Ali, announced that she had quit the party to became an independent in support of Perikatan Nasional. She came out on the grounds that he had "lost confidence in the President (Anwar Ibrahim) and his harpist leadership of the idealism of the struggle".

The exodus of party members in support of Azmin Ali continued on 21 June when 50 Johor Wanita PKR leaders left the party, followed by 25 PKR grassroots leaders in the Saratok branch, that was once led by the traitrous Ali Biju, on 22 June. This was followed by the departure of Afif Bahardin on 24 June. He had been another key Azmin ally, having previously been Deputy Youth Chief of the party before marginally losing the election for the position of Youth Chief in 2018,   His departure was followed by Haniza Talha on 29 June, who had been another prominent Azmin ally, being the women's chief of PKR as well as a Selangor Exco. On 11 July, she was sacked as a State Exco member. Haniza Talha has described PKR's decision to sack her from the party as an “act of revenge”. On the same day, she was replaced by the Kuantan MP, Fuziah Salleh, as the party's new Women's Chief

On 30 June 2020, Salleh Said Keruak, a prominent politician who was a former Sabah Chief Minister and Federal Minister from UMNO, cancelled his application to join PKR citing the party's internal turmoil. He said the decision was made last April, and with the cancellation, he remained an independent since leaving UMNO in 2018. Previously, Salleh had applied to join PKR in October of the previous year.
On 1 July 2020, Terengganu PKR women chief, Sharifah Norhayati Syed Omar Alyahya exit PKR along with 131 other members. The decision was made after seeing injustice in the party's top leadership.

The series of departures continued throughout July when PKR's Terengganu women's chief, Sharifah Norhayati Syed Omar Alyahya, left PKR along with 131 other members on 1 July. This was followed by the Penang state assemblyman from Sungai Acheh, Zulkifli Ibrahim, who was sacked from PKR before joining BERSATU on 4 July. On the same day, 250 PKR members from the Ampang branch left the party, along with two councillors, Jess Choy and Shoba Selvarajoo, who was also an Exco in the women's wing. The party's Jempol branch chief, Karip Mohd Salleh, left the party along with 25 other members on 15 July, causing the branch to be temporarily paralysed. On 30 July, Inanam assemblyman & Sabah Assistant Minister of Finance, Kenny Chua Teck Ho, was sacked from PKR for backing UMNO's Musa Aman as Chief Minister of Sabah

On 9 August 2020, BERSATU's Kuala Krau Division Chief, Mohamad Rafidee Hashim, left the party and joined PKR. He stated his action was because "the party was more consistent and principled in its efforts to fight for reform".

The defections of PKR MPs continued when two MPs, Steven Choong and  Larry Sng, who represented Tebrau and Julau respectively, became independents on 27 and 28 February 2021. They would both go on to form the Parti Bangsa Malaysia (PBM) and declare their support for the ruling Perikatan Nasional coalition.
The exodus would finally end on 13 March 2021 when PKR vice-president Xavier Jayakumar, another known Azmin ally, announced his resignation as both vice-president and party member, citing his 'frustrations' by the events of the past year. Subsequently, he would become an independent MP while declaring his full support to Perikatan Nasional's leadership.

Ideology 
PKR's constitution has as one of their core principles, the establishment of "a society that is just and a nation that is democratic, progressive and united". In practice, the party has primarily focused on promoting social justice, economic justice, eliminating political corruption and human rights issues within a non-ethnic framework.

List of leaders 

President

Deputy President

Party Organisational Structure (2022–2025)

Central Leadership Council 

 President:
 Anwar Ibrahim
 Deputy President:
 Rafizi Ramli
 Vice-Presidents (elected):
 Amirudin Shari
 Chang Lih Kang
 Nik Nazmi Nik Ahmad
 Aminuddin Harun
 Vice-Presidents (appointed):
 Nurul Izzah Anwar
 Saraswathy Kandasami
Awang Husaini Sahari
 Secretary-General:
 Saifuddin Nasution Ismail
 Treasurer:
 William Leong
 Information Chief:
 Fahmi Fadzil
 Chief Organising Secretary:
 Zahir Hassan
 Director of Communications:
 Lee Chean Chung
 Director of Strategies:
 Akmal Nasir
 Director of Election Machinery:
 Rafizi Ramli

 Central Leadership Council Members (elected):
 Dr. Maszlee Malik
 Fahmi Zainol
 Mohd Yahya Sahri
 Nurin Aina Surip
 Romli Ishak
 Siti Aishah Sheikh Ismail
 Syed Ibrahim Syed Noh
 Hans Isaac
 Simon Ooi Tze Min
 Wong Chen 
 Raiyan Abdul Rahim
 Tan Kar Hing 
 David Cheong Kian Young
 Hee Loy Sian 
 Amidi Abdul Manan
 Elizabeth Wong 
 Muhammad Bakhtiar Wan Chik
 Central Leadership Council Members (appointed):
 Manivannan Gowindasamy
 Christina Liew
 Abun Sui Anyit
 Rodziah Ismail
 Yuneswaran Ramaraj
 State Chairpersons:
 Federal Territories & Johor: Rafizi Ramli 
 Penang, Perlis & Kedah: Nurul Izzah Anwar
 Kelantan & Terengganu: Nik Nazmi Nik Ahmad
 Melaka & Negeri Sembilan: Aminuddin Harun
 Pahang & Selangor: Amirudin Shari
 Perak: Chang Lih Kang
 Sabah: Sangkar Rasam
 Sarawak: Roland Engan

Youth Wing (Angkatan Muda Keadilan) 

 Youth Chief:
 Adam Adli
 Deputy Youth Chief:
 Muhammad Kamil Abdul Munim
 Vice-Youth Chiefs (elected):
 Atyrah Hanim Razali
 Pravin Murali
 Pransanth Kumar Brakasam
 Vice-Youth Chiefs (appointed):
 Chermaine Thoo Suet Mei
 Wendey Agung Baruh
Youth Secretary:
 Omar Mokhtar A Manap
Youth Organising Secretary:
 Muhammad Arshad Hassni
Youth Treasurer:
 Mohd Hilmy Yakap
Youth Information Chief:
 Muhammad Haziq Azfar Ishak
Youth Communications Director:
 Muhammad Syaril Showkat Ali
Youth Strategies Director:
 Bryan Ng Yih Miin
Youth Elections Directors:
 Muhammad Kamil Abdul Munim 
 Prabakaran Parameswaran

 Central Angkatan Muda Keadilan Leadership Council Members (elected):
 Fify Nuriety Harfizy
 Syamil Luthfi Samsul Bahrin
 Farah Ariana Nurazam
 Nanthakumar Poapalan
 Sathasivam Manohar
 Gavin Way
 Arham Rahimin Nasution
 Muhammad Husaini Mohd Yunos
 Ahmad Umar Khair Zainuddin
 Muhd Sallehuddin Nazaruddin
 Suria Vengadesh Kerishnan
 Ooi Mei Mei 
 Nurrul Atika Azhar
 Siti Nur Qamarina Mohd Ghani 
 Mohd Fakharuddin Muslim
Central Angkatan Muda Keadilan Leadership Council Members (appointed):
 Mohd Nashriq Othaman
 Mohd Afiq Ayob
 Nadia Fathin Syahira Ahmad Nazri
 Wan Muhamad Haikal Wan Ghazali
 Ahmad Saifullah Razali
State Youth Chiefs:
 Federal Territories: Mohammad Azfar Aza Azhar
 Johor: Mohamad Taufiq Ismail
 Kedah: Mohammed Taufiq Johari
 Kelantan: Mohamad Ezzat Zahrim Mohd Hanuzi
 Melaka: Muhammad Ridhuan Abu Samah
 Negeri Sembilan: Mohamad Afif Anuar
 Pahang: Chan Chun Kuang
 Penang: Muhammad Fadzli Roslan
 Perak: Za'im Sidqi Zulkifly
 Perlis: Raskhairulimran Raszali
 Sabah: Zaidi Jatil
 Sarawak: Chiew Choon Man
 Selangor: Muhammad Izuan Ahmad Kasim
 Terengganu: Md Asyraf Zulfadhly Md Zainudin

Women's Wing (Wanita Keadilan) 

 Women's Chief:
 Fadhlina Sidek
 Deputy Women's Chief:
 Juwairiya Zulkifli
 Vice-Women's Chiefs (elected):
 Wasanthee Sinnasamy
 June Leow Hsiad Hui
 Sangetha Jayakumar
 Vice-Women's Chiefs (appointed):
 Rufinah Pangeran
 Faizah Ariffin
 Srikandi Keadilan Chief:
 Anetha Vallaitham Pillai
 Women's Secretary:
 Loh Ker Chean
 Women's Treasurer:
 Sabrina Ahmad
 Women's Information Chief:
 Suzana Shaharudin
 Women's Communications Bureau Chiefs:
 Nurhidayah Che Rose
 Farzana Hayani Mohd Nasir
 Wan Zulaika Abdul Kahar
 Women's Elections Director:
 Juwairiya Zulkifli

 Central Wanita Keadilan Leadership Council Members (elected):
 Loo Voon May
 Nor Faiza Samsi
 Telagapathi A. Marimuthu
 Mahani Abdul Moin
 Ermeemariana Saadon
 Natrah Ismail
 Siti Norffinie Mohamed Yassin
 Rabiatul Adawiyah Sulaiman
 Saribanon Saibon
 Noraziah Mohd Razit
 Mahani Masban 
 Rozaliah Mokhtar
 Karen Kasturi James
 Ruthira K. Surasan
 Wan Zulaika Abdul Kahar
 Central Wanita Keadilan Leadership Council Members (appointed):
 Sandrea Ng Shy Ching
 Haryati Abu Nasir
 Kartini Madun
 Meneng Biris
 Anie Amat
 Idawatie Pariman
 Lim Kim Eng
 Noor Amelia Zainabila Zaiffri
 Saira Banu
 Syafiqa Zakaria
 Annur Nadhirah Abdul Halim
State Women's Chiefs:
 Federal Territories: Rohani Hussin
 Johor: Zuraidah Zainab Md Zain
 Kedah: Sabrina Ahmad
 Kelantan: Nor Azmiza Mamat
 Melaka: Rusnah Aluai
 Negeri Sembilan: Noorzunita Begum Mohd Ibrahim
 Pahang: Haslindalina Hashim
 Penang: Nurhidayah Che Ros
 Perak: Norhayati Sani
 Perlis: Hashimah Hashim
 Sabah: Noriha Yakup
 Sarawak: Victoria Musa
 Selangor: Rozana Zainal Abidin
 Terengganu: Faizah Ariffin

Elected representatives

Dewan Negara (Senate)

Senators 

 His Majesty's appointee:
 Saifuddin Nasution Ismail
 Saraswathy Kandasamy
 Fuziah Salleh
 Abun Sui Anyit
 Manolan Mohamad 
 Negeri Sembilan State Legislative Assembly:
 Ahmad Azam Hamzah
 Penang State Legislative Assembly:
 Amir Md Ghazali

Dewan Rakyat (House of Representatives)

Members of Parliament of the 15th Malaysian Parliament 

PKR has 31 members in the House of Representatives.

Dewan Undangan Negeri (State Legislative Assembly)

Malaysian State Assembly Representatives 

Selangor State Legislative Assembly
Penang State Legislative Assembly
Negeri Sembilan State Legislative Assembly
Kedah State Legislative Assembly

Johor State Legislative Assembly
Perak State Legislative Assembly
Perlis State Legislative Assembly

Pahang State Legislative Assembly
Sabah State Legislative Assembly
Sarawak State Legislative Assembly 

Malacca State Legislative Assembly
Kelantan State Legislative Assembly
Terengganu State Legislative Assembly

PKR state governments

General election results

State election results

See also 
 List of political parties in Malaysia
 Malaysian General Election
 Politics of Malaysia
 Pakatan Rakyat
 Pakatan Harapan

References

External links 

 
 
 Suara Keadilan
 DemiRakyat

 
Centrist parties in Asia
Liberal parties in Malaysia
Political parties in Malaysia
Political parties established in 1999
Social liberal parties
1999 establishments in Malaysia